The Belezma National Park (Arabic:الحظيرة الوطنية بلزمة) is one of the most important national parks of Algeria. It is located in Batna Province on the slopes of the Belezma Range, a subrange of the Aurès Mountains.

Description
Created in 1984, it stretches over an area of 262.5 km, the climate ranges from a cool subhumid climate to a dry semi-arid climate, it contains 447 species of flora (14% of the national total) and 309 species of fauna, of which 59 are protected species.

The main summits of the range in the park area are 2,136 m high Djebel Tichaou and the 2,178 m high Djebel Refaâ, the highest peak of the Belezma Range.

The biosphere consists of rich mosaic habitats such as pastures, forests, grasslands, thickets, mountain's feet, rivers and mines. The biosphere reserve also includes several historical sites, caves and tombs, which represent traces of ancient civilizations. Balezma is the largest habitat of the Atlas cedar (Cedrus atlantica), a centuries-old magic tree, which is used in home crafts.

Features

See also
Belezma Range
Aurès Mountains

References

External links

National parks of Algeria
Geography of Batna Province
Protected areas established in 1984
Tourist attractions in Batna Province
1984 establishments in Algeria